This is a list of massacres in the Italian Social Republic in which there were more than 100 victims. German troops in Italy often massacred civilians in retaliation for partisan activity.

To a lesser extent, war crimes were committed by the National Republican Army (fascist Italian army), usually against Italian partisans, such as at the Salussola massacre, where 20 partisans were executed. Partisans, in retaliation, sometimes also massacred captured Fascist soldiers, like at the Rovetta massacre.

List of massacres
A list of massacres of either more than 100 victims or international notability:

See also
 List of massacres in Italy
 German war crimes in Italy during World War II

References

Italy
German military-related lists